The following tables present the ranks of the Royal Lao Armed Forces from 1955 to 1975, which, as a former French dominion, follow a rank system similar to those used by the French Armed Forces.

Commissioned officer ranks
The rank insignia of commissioned officers.

Other ranks
The rank insignia of non-commissioned officers and enlisted personnel.

References

External links
 

Laos
Royal Lao Armed Forces